During the 1999–2000 English football season, Norwich City F.C. competed in the Football League First Division.

Season summary
Manager Bruce Rioch resigned in March after failing to take Norwich anywhere near a place high enough to qualify for promotion to the Premier League. He was replaced by former Northern Ireland manager (and player for Norwich's arch-rivals Ipswich Town) Bryan Hamilton.

At the end of the season, top-scorer Iwan Roberts was named the club's player of the year. It was the second consecutive season the Welsh striker had won the award.

Kit
Norwich signed a two-year kit manufacturing deal with Alexandra plc. Norfolk-based mustard maker Colman's remained the kit sponsors.

Final league table

Results
Norwich City's score comes first

Legend

Football League First Division

FA Cup

League Cup

Players

First-team squad
Squad at end of season

Left club during season

Notes

References

Norwich City F.C. seasons
Norwich City F.C.